Serine/threonine-protein kinase 25 is an enzyme that in humans is encoded by the STK25 gene.

Interactions
STK25 has been shown to interact with STRN, PDCD10 and MOBKL3.

References

Further reading